MGI or MGI Tech is a Chinese biotechnology company, which provides a line of products and technologies that serves the genetic sequencing, genotyping and gene expression, and proteomics markets. Its headquarters are located in Shenzhen, China.

History 
In 2016, MGI was founded as a subsidiary of BGI Group. It manufactures high-throughput genetic sequencing systems and other products for use in the life sciences and health care sectors. As of July 2022, the company's operation is divided into two primary business segments: genetic sequencers and laboratory automation systems.

In May 2020, MGI raised $1 billion in series B funding from IDG Capital and CPE China Fund. In December 2020, the company submitted its IPO application to Shanghai Stock Exchange STAR Market.

Subsidiaries

Complete Genomics 
In March 2013 Complete Genomics was acquired by BGI Group. After the acquisition, Complete Genomics moved to San Jose, and in June 2018 became part of MGI, the life sciences technology and product business of BGI. The acquisition was the one of the outcomes of $1.5 billion 'collaborative funds' i.e., '10 years loan' which was initially provided by China Development Bank to acquire all 128 of Illumina, Inc.'s newest and fastest next-generation sequencers including HiSeq 2000.

Research & development 
The company is known for manufacturing DNA sequencers based on low-cost DNA nanoball sequencing technologies which was refined further by the parent company BGI after the acquisition of Complete Genomics. The refinement included combinatorial probe anchor synthesis technologies which involves loading DNA nanoballs (DNBs) onto a patterned array chip using a fluidic system. Subsequently, a sequencing primer is added to the adaptor region of the DNBs in order to hybridize them.

Critical findings 
Human exome sequencing: Only a few DNA enrichment kits, based on the hybridization of cRNA or cDNA biotinylated probes, are compatible with MGI sequencers which can be utilized for specific activities such as exome sequencing.

Viral RNA sequencing and analysis of SARS-CoV-2 Delta Variant (in Guangzhou, China): The two sets of sequencing libraries were enriched using amplicon-based and hybrid capture-based approaches, as stated in a research article published in eClinicalMedicine (a LANCET Discovery Science journal). The assessment of variation was performed using SARS-CoV-2 Multi-PCR v1.0 for data based on amplicon sequencing on MGI's ATOPlex RNA Library Prep kit and the nCoV Variant detection process for data based on hybrid capture sequencing. However, only mutation sites with a sequencing depth greater than 100× were reported.

Criticism 
On October 31, 2019, the Chairman of the Senate Finance Committee, Chuck Grassley, and Senator Marco Rubio wrote a joint letter to Alex Azar, the Secretary of the Department of Health and Human Services and Seema Verma, the Administrator of the Centers for Medicare & Medicaid Services raised their concerns against MGI, regarding the circumstances under which the CMS may finance it to process American citizens' genomic or exome data.

Litigation

Patents infringement lawsuit 
In November 2021, a federal jury in California concluded that MGI America (in its capacity as an affiliate of BGI) had infringed Illumina, Inc.'s patents. Accordingly, they awarded Illumina damages of $8 million.

In March 2022, Illumina persuaded a U.S. District Judge to prolong the restriction on MGI America selling its CoolMPS sequencers in the United States for six months until August 2022, when Illumina's patent expires.

“Two-channel” DNA sequencing lawsuit 
Complete Genomics, a research subsidiary of MGI, filed a lawsuit in May 2019, alleging that Illumina's "two-channel" DNA sequencing chemistry violates two patents for the technology that deduces the identification of each nucleotide from two signals. The NovaSeq 6000, the NextSeq 500/550/550x, and 1000/2000 Series, as well as the MiniSeq, were all the focus of the lawsuit against Illumina. Additionally, it targeted Illumina's cluster generation & sequencing, and library preparation kits, all of which are interoperable with one or more platforms.

In May 2022, A jury in Delaware concluded that Illumina's “two-channel” sequencing chemistry infringes on two patents owned by MGI Tech through its subsidiary Complete Genomics. As a result of this finding, the jury awarded $333.8 million in damages to the company. The jury also dismissed Illumina's assertions that the patents were invalid. The verdict also invalidated three of Illumina's patents that the firm had asserted in a countersuit claiming MGI Tech had infringed on Illumina's patents.

References 

Laboratory equipment manufacturers
Research support companies
Chinese companies established in 2016
Biotechnology companies of China
Genomics companies
DNA sequencing